The Nightmare Man may refer to:
 The Nightmare Man (TV series), a 1981 science fiction drama serial
 The Nightmare Man (The Sarah Jane Adventures), a two-part story of The Sarah Jane Adventures 
 Nightmare Man (film), a 2006 horror film